The following television stations operate on virtual channel 61 in the United States:

 K34EE-D in Prescott-Cottonwood, Arizona
 KASW in Phoenix, Arizona
 KAXW-LD in Mullin, Texas
 KTFF-DT in Porterville, California
 KZJL in Houston, Texas
 WDSI-TV in Chattanooga, Tennessee
 WFGC in Palm Beach, Florida
 WOSC-CD in Pittsburgh, Pennsylvania
 WPPX-TV in Wilmington, Delaware
 WQHS-DT in Cleveland, Ohio
 WTIC-TV in Hartford, Connecticut
 WTSF in Ashland, Kentucky

The following stations, which are no longer licensed, formerly operated on virtual channel 61 in the United States:
 K21EA-D in Lake Havasu City, Arizona
 K34EF-D in Kingman, Arizona
 W25EG-D in Columbus, Georgia

References

61 virtual